The Campeonato Argentino de Rugby 1979 was won by the selection of Buenos Aires that beat in the final the selection of Unión de Rugby de Rosario

Rugby Union in Argentina in 1979 
 The Buenos Aires Champsionship was won by San Isidro Club
 The Cordoba Province Championship was won by Tala
 The North-East Championship was won by Lawn Tennis
 The selection of Buenos Aires won also the "Campeonato Juvenil" (under-19)

International 

 In 1979 the Argentine national team went to New Zealand. The tours was scheduled in the same period of this championship. That meant the absence of better players in the championship.

 In October-November, Australia toured Argentina. Argentina won the first test-match 24-13, the Wallabies the second 17-12-

Preliminaries

Zone 1

Zone 2

Zone 3

Zone 4

Interzone

Semifinals

Third place final

Final

 Rosario: 15.Baetti, 14.Nogués, 13.Trini, 12.Escalante (cap.), 11.Basilico, 10.Dip, 9.Niccia, 8.Marengo, 7.Imhoff, 6.Poet, 5.Milano, 4.Mangiamelli, 3.Sandionigi, 2.Cristini, 2.Fernández.
  Buenos Aires: 15.Argerich, 14. Ramallo, 13.Beccar Varela, 12.Jacobi, 11.Puccio, 10. Sanguinetti, 9. Nicholson, 8. García Terán, 7.Negri, 6. Glastra, 5.Minguez, 4.Bottarini, 3.Devoto, 2.Sartori, 1.Ventura (cap.)

External links 
 Memorias de la UAR 1979
 Francesco Volpe, Paolo Pacitti (Author), Rugby 2000, GTE Gruppo Editorale (1999)

Campeonato Argentino de Rugby
Argentina